Round Towers GAA may refer to:

Round Towers GAA (Kildare) - Kildare town
Round Towers GAA (Clondalkin) - Dublin
Round Towers GAA (London) - London
Round Towers GAA (Lusk) - Dublin